Sutra copying is the East Asian practice of hand-copying Buddhist sutras.

Purpose 
Sutra copying is considered a merit in Buddhism. Other meritorious practices included the memorization and recitation of sutras. The effort of sutra copying is considered an expression of piety. It is recognized as a devotional practice, since it comprises worship, literature, and calligraphy. Since early in history, it was also not uncommon for people to sponsor monks and nuns to recite or copy sutras, thus indirectly cultivating merit in one's ancestors, family, and self by transference.

History 
The practice of sutra copying originated in China. Sutra copying was imported to Korea in the third century. During the Nara period (710–794) in Japan, the practice of sutra copying became very popular in society.

References 

Buddhism in China
Buddhism in Japan
Buddhism in Korea